Geoffrey (Geoff) Meeks (born 1949) is a British accounting scholar and Professor of Financial Accounting at the University of Cambridge, known for his work "Accounting standards and the economics of standards."

Biography 
Meeks obtained his BA in Economics from the University of Cambridge in 1971 and a Ph.D. in Accounting and Economics from the University of Edinburgh in 1975 

Meeks started his career as accountant trainee in Price Waterhouse in 1971. From 1972 to 1975 he was Research Associate at the University of Edinburgh, Department of Accounting and Business Method. In 1975 he moved to the University of Cambridge, where he started as Postdoctoral Research Fellow, and became Research Officer at the Department of Applied Economics. At Cambridge he was Assistant Director of Research and Director of Graduate Studies of the Economics Faculty from 1975 to 1990. In 1990 he was appointed University Lecturer in Accounting, and became Senior Lecturer, and since 2003 Professor of Financial Accounting.

Meeks was Acting Dean of the University's Cambridge Judge Business School from 2010 to 2011. He has held visiting positions at Harvard Business School, INSEAD, and London School of Economics. He is a member of the Academic Panel of the Accounting Standards Board.

Work 
Meeks accounting research is at the intersection of economics and accounting. He has been among the first to:
 construct large electronic databases of company financial statements, and deploy them to answer questions from industrial and financial economics
 marry macroeconomic models with models of company accounts
 exploit economic cost-benefit analysis to assess the efficient level of accounting regulation.
Recurrent themes have included dysfunctional takeover and inefficient insolvency. Early work reported the disappointing financial results of the average takeover; then sought explanations of these results in systems of directors' pay, and in directors' misinforming shareholders. On insolvency, he has analysed the role of exogenous macroeconomic shocks and of accounting valuation conventions in distorting the process of company failure.

Meeks has been heavily involved in the adoption by Cambridge of taught Masters courses; and has been founding director or co-founder of the Cambridge MPhil in Economics, MPhil in Finance, and Master of Finance programmes.

Selected publications 
 Simpson, D., Meeks, G., Klumpes, P., & Andrews, P. (2000). Some cost-benefit issues in financial regulation. London: Financial Services Authority.

Articles, a selection:
 Botsari, Antonia, and Geoff Meeks. "Do acquirers manage earnings prior to a share for share bid?." Journal of Business Finance & Accounting 35.5‐6 (2008): 633-670.
 Meeks, Geoff, and GM Peter Swann. "Accounting standards and the economics of standards." Accounting and Business Research 39.3 (2009): 191-210.

References

External links 
 Cambridge Judge Business School : Geoff Meeks

1949 births
Living people
British accountants
British economists
Alumni of Queens' College, Cambridge
Alumni of the University of Edinburgh
Academics of the University of Cambridge
Academics of the University of Edinburgh